Komsomolsky is a rural locality (a settlement) in Alexeyevskoye Rural Settlement of Krasnoborsky District, Arkhangelsk Oblast, Russia. The population was 207 as of 2010. There are 5 streets.

Geography 
Komsomolsky is located 37 km southwest of Krasnoborsk (the district's administrative centre) by road. Berezovka is the nearest rural locality.

References 

Rural localities in Krasnoborsky District